Regan is a surname and a given name.

Regan may also refer to the following places:

 Regan, North Dakota, United States, a city
 Mount Regan (British Columbia), Canada
 Mount Regan (Idaho), United States